George Britton may refer to:
George Britton (musician) (1910–1991), American opera singer, folk guitarist, and musical theatre actor
George Britton (cricketer) (1843–1910), English first class cricketer
George Britton Halford (1824–1910), English-born Australian anatomist and physiologist
George Britton (politician) (1863–1929), English boot and shoe manufacturer and Member of Parliament
George Crawford Britton (1854–1929), South Dakota and Washington state politician and lawyer